The Kings Challenge is an annual dirt track racing meeting held in Australia for Sprintcars.

After the success of the 1995 Australian Sprintcar Championship at the speedway, the first Kings Challenge was held in 1995 and was won by Sydney-based driver Brooke Tatnell.

Traditionally run on the Friday night before the Grand Annual Sprintcar Classic at the Premier Speedway in Warrnambool (Victoria), the $10,000 to win event was moved to the Thursday night to accommodate the Classic's move to a 3-day event in 2014. With the Kings Challenge running prior to the Classic, the event attracts the best sprintcar drivers from Australia and the United States.

Brooke Tatnell (1995), Skip Jackson (1998), Danny Lasoski (2001) and Donny Schatz (2002) are the only drivers to have won the Kings Challenge / Sprintcar Classic double in the same year.

Winners since 1995

 Kerry Madsen became a naturalised United States citizen and is officially an Iowa driver for World of Outlaws.  Australian sprint car racing uses State of Origin, where he is listed as NSW in his entry.

References

See also
 Australian Sprintcar Championship
 Grand Annual Sprintcar Classic
 World Series Sprintcars

Kings Challenge
Sprintcar
Sprint car racing